Des is a British three-part television drama miniseries, based on the 1983 arrest of Scottish serial killer Dennis Nilsen, after the discovery of human remains causing the blockage of a drain near his home. The series premiered on 14 September 2020.

Cast
 David Tennant as Dennis Nilsen, serial killer
 Daniel Mays as Detective Chief Inspector Peter Jay
 Jason Watkins as biographer Brian Masters
 Ron Cook as DSI Geoff Chambers
 Barry Ward as DI Steve McCusker
 Doc Brown as DC Brian Lodge (Credited as Ben Bailey)
 Ross Anderson as Douglas Stewart, one of the attempted murder victims
 Laurie Kynaston as Carl Stottor, one of the attempted murder victims
 Jamie Parker as Allan Green QC, trial prosecution counsel
 Pip Torrens as Ivan Lawrence QC, trial defence counsel
 Ken Bones as Justice David Croom-Johnson, trial judge
 Bronagh Waugh as Charlotte Proctor
 Ibinabo Jack as Lesley Mead

Episodes

Production
In November 2019, production began on Des, starring David Tennant as Dennis Nilsen.

The drama is the ninth in a sequence of ITV miniseries featuring notorious British murder cases of the past two centuries, following on from This Is Personal: The Hunt for the Yorkshire Ripper (2000), Shipman (2002), A Is for Acid (2002), The Brides in the Bath (2003), See No Evil: The Moors Murders (2006), Appropriate Adult (2011), Dark Angel (2016), In Plain Sight (2016). The next in the sequence is The Pembrokeshire Murders (2021).

Reception

Ratings
The premiere episode was watched live by 5.4 million viewers on ITV, a benchmark previously hit in 2019 with Cleaning Up. The peak was 5.9 and nearly a third of all viewers were watching it at the time of its airing.

Critical reception
The series was well received by critics and described as a "sensitive, finely worked drama showing the unrelentingly bleak reality of the monstrous narcissist". Tennant's performance was considered "one of his best in an impeccable career".

Rotten Tomatoes reported an approval rating of 89%. The website's critics consensus reads, "Des is a smartly scripted, sufficiently eerie true crime drama anchored by a chilling performance from David Tennant."

Awards
In 2021, David Tennant won the International Emmy Award for Best Actor, at the 49th International Emmy Awards, for his role in the show.

References

External links
 

2020 British television series debuts
2020 British television series endings
2020s British crime drama television series
2020s British LGBT-related drama television series
2020s British police procedural television series
2020s British television miniseries
Cultural depictions of British men
Cultural depictions of male serial killers
English-language television shows
ITV crime dramas
ITV miniseries
Television series about serial killers
Television series by All3Media
Television series set in 1983
Television series set in the 1970s
Television shows set in London
True crime television series